Lawson is a city in Clay, Clinton, and Ray counties in the U.S. state of Missouri and part of the Kansas City metropolitan area. The population was 2,541 at the 2020 census.

Geography
Lawson is located at  (39.437848, -94.207973).

Demographics

2010 census
As of the census of 2010, there were 2,473 people, 876 households, and 676 families living in the city. The racial makeup of the city was 97.4% White, 0.1% African American, 0.7% Native American, 0.2% Asian, 0.2% from other races, and 1.4% from two or more races. Hispanic or Latino of any race were 1.1% of the population.

There were 876 households, of which 45.2% had children under the age of 18 living with them, 59.1% were married couples living together, 13.0% had a female householder with no husband present, 5.0% had a male householder with no wife present, and 22.8% were non-families. 20.7% of all households were made up of individuals, and 10.4% had someone living alone who was 65 years of age or older. The average household size was 2.79 and the average family size was 3.21.

The median age in the city was 33.1 years. 31.2% of residents were under the age of 18; 7.6% were between the ages of 18 and 24; 26.3% were from 25 to 44; 23.2% were from 45 to 64; and 11.8% were 65 years of age or older. The gender makeup of the city was 48.5% male and 51.5% female.

2000 census
As of the census of 2000, there were 2,336 people, 818 households, and 624 families living in the city. The population density was 838.3 people per square mile (323.3/km2). There were 852 housing units at an average density of 305.7 per square mile (117.9/km2). The racial makeup of the city was 97.65% White, 0.30% African American, 0.13% Native American, 0.39% Asian, 0.39% from other races, and 1.16% from two or more races. Hispanic or Latino of any race were 0.77% of the population.

There were 818 households, out of which 45.2% had children under the age of 18 living with them, 62.3% were married couples living together, 10.9% had a female householder with no husband present, and 23.7% were non-families. 21.8% of all households were made up of individuals, and 12.2% had someone living alone who was 65 years of age or older. The average household size was 2.80 and the average family size was 3.29.

In the city the population was spread out, with 32.7% under the age of 18, 7.9% from 18 to 24, 29.6% from 25 to 44, 17.6% from 45 to 64, and 12.2% who were 65 years of age or older. The median age was 32 years. For every 100 females, there were 93.2 males. For every 100 females age 18 and over, there were 84.6 males.

The median income for a household in the city was $41,875, and the median income for a family was $49,018. Males had a median income of $38,875 versus $22,273 for females. The per capita income for the city was $17,438. About 6.8% of families and 7.0% of the population were below the poverty line, including 8.1% of those under age 18 and 9.0% of those age 65 or over.

History
Lawson was founded in 1870 and was named for New York businessman L. M. Lawson. A post office called Lawson has been in operation since 1876.

Lawson is home to Ray County's oldest bank, Lawson Bank, founded in 1883. Interesting sites near Lawson include the historic Watkins Mill (now a Missouri state park and National Historic Landmark) and KC-10L, a Nike missile base, located a mile east of Lawson (Nov 1959 - Feb 1964).

Community and government
Lawson is a fourth class city under Missouri statutes and has a governing body consisting of the Mayor and a four-member Board of Aldermen.  Other decision making bodies include: the Planning and Zoning Commission, the Board of Adjustment and the Parks Board. The City Hall staff includes a City Administrator, City Clerk, staff, and a Municipal Court Clerk.  There is a Director of Public Works with a small staff.
The Chief of Police has seven officers. The City Attorney, Municipal Court Judge and Prosecutor serve on a contract basis.

Regarding recreation, in addition to Watkins Mill, there is an 18-hole golf course and the Lawson City Lake north of the city limits.  Lawson also has a baseball/softball complex and a small city park.

Education
Public education in Lawson is administered by Lawson R-XIV School District, which operates one elementary school, one middle school, and Lawson High School.

Lawson has a public library, the Lawson Community Branch Library.

References

External links
 City of Lawson official website
 Lawson Chamber of Commerce
 Historic maps of Lawson in the Sanborn Maps of Missouri Collection at the University of Missouri

Cities in Clay County, Missouri
Cities in Clinton County, Missouri
Cities in Ray County, Missouri
Cities in Missouri